1922 is a 2017 American horror drama film written and directed by Zak Hilditch, based on Stephen King's 2010 novella of the same name. Starring Thomas Jane, Neal McDonough, and Molly Parker, the film was released on Netflix on October 20, 2017.

Plot
In 1922, Wilfred "Wilf" James is a farmer living in Hemingford, Nebraska with his wife, Arlette James, and their 14-year-old son, Henry. Wilf is strongly opposed to Arlette's plans to sell the farm and move to Omaha. He decides to convince Henry to help murder Arlette, holding Henry's girlfriend, Shannon Cotterie, whose relationship Arlette opposes, at stake. Henry reluctantly agrees to assist his father in carrying out the murder.

Wilf pretends to agree to the sale, appeasing Arlette. As she celebrates, she becomes inebriated. After Wilf carries her to bed in a drunken stupor, Henry covers her face while Wilf cuts her throat with a butcher's knife. Wilf dumps her body into a dry well where her corpse is soon fed upon by rats. The next day, they drop a cow into the well to hide Arlette's body and provide a reason for filling in the well. Sheriff Jones is suspicious following her sudden disappearance; he searches the house, but finds no proof of a crime, tentatively believing Wilf's story that his wife absconded.

As time passes, Henry becomes brooding and isolated, regretting the crime that he and his father have committed. Shannon grows increasingly concerned and subsequently discovers she is pregnant with Henry's child. Her parents decide to send her to a Catholic institution in Omaha until the baby is born and will then be placed for adoption. Henry steals Wilf's car, arrives in Omaha, and runs away with Shannon.

As the winter passes, Wilf appears to be going insane, being constantly harassed by rats. He takes out a mortgage on his house to fix it up, but is never actually able to begin the work, as a rat bites his hand while he searches through an upstairs closet. Owing to continued neglect, the roofs on his barn and his house cave in, but he is too consumed by guilt and alcohol to fix them, and in his increasing isolation, his hand injury worsens. His house falls in to a state of total disrepair and becomes completely infested by rats.

In a climactic scene, Wilf is confronted by the ghost of his wife, surrounded by the rats that ate her corpse. She corners him in the basement and sadistically whispers to him. She recounts, as the viewer sees, the fate of Henry and Shannon. They became robbers, known as the "Sweetheart Bandits". During one of their heists, Shannon is shot, causing her to miscarry the baby and ultimately die from massive blood loss in an abandoned house they found by the side of the road. Henry lies down next to her and dies by suicide with a handgun.

Later, while in the hospital after his hand is amputated owing to the infection, Wilf is told by the sheriff that an unidentified woman's body has been found on the side of the road, which the sheriff assumes is Arlette. Henry's body is delivered to Wilf, which, like his mother's body, has been chewed through by rats. No one attends Henry's funeral except for Wilf. He again sees the ghost of his wife surrounded by rats. Wilf attempts to sell his land to Shannon's father, who bluntly tells Wilf to leave his property and never come back. After selling the land to the livestock company at a low price, Wilf moves to Omaha and finds a job hauling pallets, but cannot escape being followed by rats.

Eight years later, in 1930, Wilf writes his confession, concluding, "In the end, we all get caught." By the time he finishes, dozens of rats have swarmed his room. Arlette, Henry, and Shannon's corpses have appeared in front of Wilf. Brandishing the same butcher's knife used to kill his mother, Henry tells Wilf that his death will be quick.

Cast
 Thomas Jane as Wilfred "Wilf" Leland James
 Dylan Schmid as Henry "Hank" Freeman James
 Molly Parker as Arlette Christina Winters James
 Neal McDonough as Harlan "Harl" Cotterie
 Kaitlyn Bernard as Shannon Cotterie
 Brian d'Arcy James as Sheriff Jones
 Bob Frazer as Mr. Lester

Production
While working on These Final Hours (2013), director Zak Hilditch came across Full Dark, No Stars (2010), a collection of four novellas by Stephen King including Big Driver, Fair Extension, A Good Marriage, and 1922. After These Final Hours was completed, Hilditch decided to adapt 1922 into a motion picture, as he had found the story to have been "cinematic" on its own. Writing a speculative screenplay before finding out if he would be able to obtain the rights to the project, Hilditch was given six months to finish writing his script. After meeting producer Ross M. Dinerstein in Los Angeles, who sent his screenplay to Netflix, Hilditch was quickly told that his idea would become a film under the platform.

Principal photography for 1922 began in Vancouver with cinematographer Ben Richardson to take advantage of the tax credit given to films shot in Canada. Due to harvesting season, a farmhouse with a cornfield could not be found in time before filming, resulting in the corn depicted in the film being made using corn props from China, computer graphics (CG), and shots taken in Boort, Australia. A farmhouse located in the city of Langley was eventually used during the shooting of the project, with filming concluding in Boort.

Reception 
1922 received positive reviews. Review aggregator website Rotten Tomatoes reports an approval rating of 91% based on 44 reviews, with an average rating of 6.9/10. The site's critics' consensus reads: "Thanks to director Zak Hilditch's patient storytelling and strong work from lead Thomas Jane, 1922 ranks among the more satisfying Stephen King adaptations." Metacritic reports an aggregated score of 70 out of 100 based on 8 critics, indicating "generally favorable reviews".

John DeFore of The Hollywood Reporter stated "[the] film is not lurid in its scares, and instead depicts its protagonist's suffering mostly as a slow rot."

Critics also lauded Thomas Jane's portrayal of Wilfred James. "The bulk of the movie's appeal, however, comes from Thomas Jane, delivering his most effective performance in ages," said Eric Kohn on Indiewire. "He plays tortured would-be lunatic Wilfred James, who lords over 80 acres of Nebraska farmland that his family has owned for generations. Within five minutes, a disheveled Wilfred establishes in voiceover that he's confessing a crime, and by ten minutes, it's clear what he's done."

References

External links 
 
 
 

2017 horror films
American horror drama films
English-language Netflix original films
Films based on American horror novels
Films based on works by Stephen King
Films set in 1922
Films set in 1930
Films set on farms
Films set in Nebraska
Films shot in Vancouver
Films set in country houses
Uxoricide in fiction
2010s English-language films
2010s American films